Halfdan Ditlev-Simonsen, Jr. (8 February 1924 – 19 December 1989) was a Norwegian sailor. He competed in the 5.5 Metre event at the 1956 Summer Olympics.

References

External links
 

1924 births
1989 deaths
Norwegian male sailors (sport)
Olympic sailors of Norway
Sailors at the 1956 Summer Olympics – 5.5 Metre
Sportspeople from Oslo